The Faroe Islands U19 National Team represents the Faroe Islands at under-19 age level and is controlled by the Faroe Islands Football Association.

The team is most recently took part in the 2012 UEFA Under-19 qualifiers in the first qualification round, in November 2011.

Current squad
 The following players were called up for the 2023 UEFA European Under-19 Championship qualification matches.
 Match dates: 16, 19 and 22 November 2022
 Caps and goals correct as of:''' 26 September 2022, after the match against

2012 UEFA European Under-19 Football Championship qualification

The Squad of October 2012

The Squad of 2010 
The coaches Abraham Løkin and Eli Hentze selected the squad for the UEFA Under 19 qualifier matches in October 2010 against Croatia U19, Italy U19 and Latvia U19.

|-----
! colspan="9" bgcolor="#B0D3FB" align="left" |
|----- bgcolor="#DFEDFD"

|-----
! colspan="9" bgcolor="#B0D3FB" align="left" |
|----- bgcolor="#DFEDFD"

|-----
! colspan="9" bgcolor="#B0D3FB" align="left" |
|----- bgcolor="#DFEDFD"

References 

European national under-19 association football teams
Faroe Islands national football team